Lloyd W. Bailey (March 24, 1928 – August 12, 2020) was a faithless elector, physician and ophthalmologist from Rocky Mount, North Carolina, who achieved notoriety during the 1968 U.S. presidential election when, on December 16, 1968, he became the 145th faithless elector in the history of the United States Electoral College. Because of Bailey's vote, Nixon received 301 electoral votes instead of the expected 302 electoral votes; Bailey's vote did not affect the outcome of the election.

Career
Bailey received a BS degree at Wake Forest College in 1949, and an MD degree from Jefferson Medical College in 1953, completing his residency and training at University of Pennsylvania and Wills Eye Hospital.

Bailey became a life member of the John Birch Society in 1961.

In the 1968 presidential election, though a Republican-pledged elector, Bailey cast his vote for American Independent Party presidential nominee George Wallace and his running-mate Curtis LeMay, instead of for Richard Nixon and Spiro Agnew, who had carried his state. Wallace and LeMay won elections in five states (Alabama, Arkansas, Georgia, Louisiana and Mississippi) with their 45 electoral votes and Bailey's vote gave them a total of 46 electoral votes.

Bailey at first claimed that when he was chosen as an elector by state party convention he had not pledged to cast his votes for Nixon and Agnew. Bailey further claimed that since Wallace had won in the district he represented, he was obligated to cast his votes for Wallace and LeMay. He also claimed that he forgot all about it until a party official reminded him of his electoral duties.

Bailey, a staunch conservative and a member of the John Birch Society, later admitted that he did not vote for Nixon because the President-elect had announced his intention to appoint Henry Kissinger and Daniel Patrick Moynihan to government positions, and had asked Chief Justice Earl Warren to stay in office through the end of June 1969. Bailey stated that if altering his vote would have changed the outcome of the election he would not have done it, and that his vote for Wallace was simply a protest. He became known as a "protest elector".

Due to Bailey's actions some members of Congress, most notably Senator Edmund Muskie of Maine (a defeated Democratic Vice Presidential nominee) and Representative James O'Hara of Michigan tried to invoke an 1887 statute under which both houses of the United States Congress may disqualify any vote by an elector that has not been "regularly given." However, the motion was defeated. Bailey himself appeared at congressional hearings regarding this case. Bailey's actions prompted calls for reform of the system. Polls at the time showed that the vast majority of Americans, over 70%, would support replacing the Electoral College with popular, direct voting as advocated by Birch Bayh, or retaining electoral votes without electors themselves, as proposed by Hale Boggs.

In 1969, in response to Bailey's vote, North Carolina passed a law requiring electors to vote for the nominee of their party.

In 2008 Bailey was appointed to the JBS Council.

References

1928 births
2020 deaths
American ophthalmologists
Faithless electors
People from Rocky Mount, North Carolina
North Carolina Republicans
John Birch Society members